Leif Thor Olafsson, also Thorleiv Olavsson (died 1 Sep 1455) was a Roman Catholic prelate who served as Bishop of Viborg (1440–1451) and Bishop of Bjørgvin (1451–1455).

Biography 
In 1440, Leif Thor Olafsson was appointed during the papacy of Pope Eugene IV as Bishop of Viborg. On 14 Apr 1451, he was appointed during the papacy of Pope Nicholas V as Bishop of Bjørgvin He served as Bishop of Bjørgvin until his death on 1 Sep 1455. at Munkeliv Abbey during an attack by Hanseatic merchants pursuing Olav Nilsson, commander of the royal castle in Bergen, who had sought sanctuary in the abbey. Olav Nilsson was also killed.

References 

15th-century Roman Catholic bishops in Denmark
Bishops appointed by Pope Eugene IV
Bishops appointed by Pope Nicholas V
1455 deaths
15th-century Roman Catholic bishops in Norway